Admiral Cooke may refer to:

Anthony Cooke (Royal Navy officer) (1927–2019), British Royal Navy rear admiral
Charles M. Cooke Jr. (1886–1970), U.S. Navy admiral
David Cooke (Royal Navy officer) (1955–2014), British Royal Navy rear admiral
Gervaise Cooke (1911–1976), British Royal Navy rear admiral
Henry D. Cooke (admiral) (1879–1958), U.S. Navy rear admiral

See also
Admiral Cook (disambiguation)